Taitung County is represented in the Legislative Yuan since 2008 by one at-large single-member constituency (Taitung County Constituency).

Current district
 Taitung County

Legislators

 Justin Huang Chien-ting resigned in 2009 after elected Taitung County magistrate.

Election results

2020

2016

References 

Constituencies in Taiwan
Taitung County